The 2017–18 Borussia Mönchengladbach season was the 118th season in the football club's history and 10th consecutive and 50th overall season in the top flight of German football, the Bundesliga, having been promoted from the 2. Bundesliga in 2008. In addition to the domestic league, Borussia Mönchengladbach also participated in this season's edition of the domestic cup, the DFB-Pokal. This was the 14th season for Mönchengladbach in the Borussia-Park, located in Mönchengladbach, North Rhine-Westphalia, Germany. The season covered a period from 1 July 2017 to 30 June 2018.

Players

Squad information

Transfers

In

Out

Competitions

Overview

Bundesliga

League table

Results summary

Results by round

Matches

DFB-Pokal

Statistics

Appearances and goals

|-
! colspan=14 style=background:#dcdcdc; text-align:center| Goalkeepers

|-
! colspan=14 style=background:#dcdcdc; text-align:center| Defenders

|-
! colspan=14 style=background:#dcdcdc; text-align:center| Midfielders

|-
! colspan=14 style=background:#dcdcdc; text-align:center| Forwards

|-
! colspan=14 style=background:#dcdcdc; text-align:center| Players transferred out during the season

References

Borussia Mönchengladbach seasons
Mönchengladbach, Borussia